Antal Papp (17 November 1867 – 24 December 1945) was a Ruthenian and Hungarian Greek Catholic hierarch. He was bishop of the Ruthenian Catholic Eparchy of Mukacheve from 1912 to 1924, Apostolic Administrator of the new created Hungarian Greek Catholic Eparchy of Hajdúdorog from 1912 to 1913 and Apostolic Administrator of Apostolic Exarchate of Miskolc from 1924 to 1945 as titular archbishop of Cyzicus.

Born in Nagykálló, Austria-Hungary in 1867, he was ordained a priest on 24 December 1893. He was appointed the Bishop by the Holy See on 29 April 1912. He was consecrated to the Episcopate on 14 October 1912. The principal consecrator was Bishop Julije Drohobeczky, and the principal co-consecrators were Bishop József Lányi de Késmark and Bishop Gyözö Horváth. Bishop Papp was elevated as titular archbishop of Cyzicus on 14 July 1924.

He died in Miskolc on 24 December 1945.

References 

1867 births
1945 deaths
20th-century Eastern Catholic bishops
Hungarian Eastern Catholics
Ruthenian Catholic bishops
Hungarian bishops
People from Szabolcs-Szatmár-Bereg County